The International Campaign for Tibet (ICT) is a non-profit advocacy group working to promote democratic freedoms for Tibetans, ensure their human rights, and protect Tibetan culture and the environment. Founded in 1988, ICT is the world's largest Tibet-related NGO, with several thousand members and strong bases of support in North America and Europe. On March 15, 2018, the ICT completed 30 years of service to the Tibetan community and received a video message from the Dalai Lama. ICT also released its new logo. An event was also held in the United States Congress on March 6, 2018 to mark the event with Congressional leaders Nancy Pelosi, Ileana Ros-Lehtinen, Jim McGovern, ICT Chairman Richard Gere, Representative Ngodup Tsering and ICT Board Member Tempa Tsering making remarks.

ICT maintains offices in Washington D.C., Amsterdam, Brussels and Berlin.  ICT's work focuses on three main areas: reporting on the situation inside Tibet, advocating for Tibet with governments, and reaching out to Chinese individuals, organizations, and media entities.

Profile
The International Campaign for Tibet works to promote self-determination, human rights, and democratic freedoms for the Tibetan people, and negotiations between the 14th Dalai Lama and the People's Republic of China.  The three main departments of ICT are devoted to reporting and communications, advocacy, and Chinese outreach.

Monitoring and reporting on human rights, environmental and socio-economic conditions in Tibet makes up a significant portion of ICT's activities, with information coming directly from inside Tibet and also from a network of Tibetan researchers based in India and Nepal.

ICT advocacy efforts are focused on securing humanitarian and development assistance for Tibetans, and working with governments to develop policies and programs to help Tibetans.  ICT asks its members to petition governments on behalf of Tibet, and organizes activities like the annual Tibet Lobby Day which gives constituents a chance to directly ask their representatives to help Tibet.  Additional advocacy efforts are focused on achieving the release of Tibetans imprisoned for their political or religious beliefs.

Through Chinese Outreach, ICT engages Chinese thinkers and the broader Chinese public with the goal of increasing mutual understanding between Chinese and Tibetans.  ICT is a member of International Federation for Human Rights.

Publications
ICT publishes several major reports each year, such as "A policy alienating Tibetans" – the denial of passports to Tibetans as China intensifies control; Dangers of China's counter-terrorism law for Tibetans and Uyghurs; Dangerous Crossing, report on Tibetan refugees seeking to escape repression in Tibet under Chinese rule; Storm in the Grasslands: Self-immolations in Tibet and Chinese policy; and Nomads in 'no man's land': China's nomination for UNESCO World heritage risks imperilling Tibetans and wildlife.  Other reports include one focused on the 2008 Tibetan Uprising and the ensuing Chinese crackdown in Tibet, and a 2012 report entitled "60 Years of Chinese Misrule" which concludes that Chinese policies in Tibet have created elements of cultural genocide.

Periodical publications include the quarterly Tibet Press Watch.

Key people
Richard Gere, Chair of the ICT Board.
Bhuchung Tsering, Interim President.
Vincent Metten, EU Policy Director.
Tsering Jampa, Executive Director of ICT Europe in Amsterdam.
Kai Muller, Executive Director of ICT Germany in Berlin.
Tencho Gyatso, Interim Vice President

Rowell Fund
Following the August 2002 deaths of ICT Co-chair Galen Rowell and his wife, Barbara Rowell, the ICT Board of Directors established the Rowell Fund.  The Fund gives small grants to Tibetans whose projects deal with the environment/conservation, photography, humanitarian projects, journalism/literature, and women's projects.  In recent years the amount dispensed by the Rowell Fund has ranged from $35,000 to more than $40,000.

Light of Truth Award
ICT presents the Light of Truth Award, a human rights award to individuals and institutions who have made significant contributions to the public understanding of Tibet and the fight for human rights and democratic freedoms of the Tibetan people. The award itself is a simple Tibetan butter lamp, symbolizing the extraordinary light that each recipient has drawn to the Tibet issue. On one occasion, in 2001, the award was presented to all the people of India, with president R. Venkataraman accepting delivery of the prize. The majority of the awards have been presented since 1995 by the fourteenth Dalai Lama, Tenzin Gyatso, to the recipients personally. The recipients are:

 1995: A. M. Rosenthal
 1996: Richard Gere, Lavinia Currier, and Michael Currier
 1997: Charlie Rose, and Claiborne Pell
 1998: Martin Scorsese, and Melissa Mathison
 1999: Hugh Edward Richardson, and Danielle Mitterrand
 2000: Richard C. Blum
 2001: The people of India, taken delivery of by R. Venkataraman
 2002: Heinrich Harrer, and Petra Kelly
 2003: Benjamin A. Gilman, Michele Bohana, and Robert Thurman
 2004: Otto Graf Lambsdorff, Irmtraut Wäger, and Václav Havel
 2005: Elie Wiesel, Carl Gershman, and Lowell Thomas Jr.
 2006: Hergé Foundation, and Desmond Tutu
 2009: Julia Taft, and Wang Lixiong
 2011: George Patterson
 2013: Professor Dr. Christian Schwarz-Schilling, The International Commission of Jurists, Ms. Sigrid Joss-Arnd, Professor Theo van Boven and Robert Ford
 2018: Grace Spring

Financials
ICT derives the vast majority of its funding (81%) from membership contributions, according to the 2010 financial statement.  Smaller sources of funding include donations from foundations (3%) and grants (1%).

See also 
 Voice of Tibet (Norway)

Notes

External links
Official website
ICT Germany website
ICT French website
ICT Dutch website
ICT Chinese website
ICT Tibet Policy Resources site
ICT Blog

Human rights organizations based in the United States
International organizations based in the United States
Tibetan independence movement
Organizations established in 1988
International Federation for Human Rights member organizations